is a 2013 Japanese superhero anime film by Madhouse that follows up on the Marvel Anime series. It is directed by Hiroshi Hamasaki, an anime director who is known for his works including Shigurui: Death Frenzy and Texhnolyze, and based on a story written by Brandon Auman. Matthew Mercer and Norman Reedus voiced Tony Stark and Punisher respectively.

Plot
While racing in a Utah desert with War Machine (James "Rhodey" Rhodes), Iron Man is ambushed by a mysterious new enemy who tries to destroy Tony Stark's new security satellite, "The Howard". War Machine is seemingly killed in the struggle and Iron Man sets out for revenge. He is intercepted by S.H.I.E.L.D. and Nick Fury who needs to talk to him. He escapes and makes it over to Pepper Potts who is on vacation.

They discover that A.I.M. (Advanced Idea Mechanics) has been conducting research into techno organic weaponry for some time and pinpoint one of their warehouses in Karachi. S.H.I.E.L.D. locates them and Tony comes out the front to be surrounded by Mandroids. He activates his suitcase armor, destroys all the Mandroids, and heads to Karachi. The scene then cuts to a member of A.I.M. trying to sell weapons to a buyer. Punisher comes in and breaks it up. Just as Punisher is about to kill the A.I.M. member, Iron Man saves him in order to get some answers. Iron Man and Punisher then work together and discover the identity of the new enemy being Ezekiel Stane, the son of Obadiah Stane. Hawkeye and Black Widow are given orders to retrieve Iron Man. Iron Man escapes with the help of the Punisher and continues on to Shanghai where he meets Ezekiel.

Ezekiel paralyzes Iron Man with the Technovore and details his plan to replace humanity with his new technology utilizing the technology on the "Howard" satellite to hack into all computers and satellites. Hawkeye and Black Widow show up and arrest both. Later on the Helicarrier, Iron Man discovers War Machine is barely alive. Then the Technovore hacks the craft leaving Iron Man to uses his arc reactor to stabilize the Helicarrier and drive the Technovore out of the systems. Ezekiel is now betrayed by the Technovore and taken over by it causing a big fight with Iron Man resulting in the Helicarrier crashing into Shanghai. When all hope seems lost, War Machine miraculously wakes up and helps Iron Man fight the Technovore.

In a last ditch effort, Iron Man is able to use a backdoor he built into the Howard's system to hack back into it temporarily. He is purposely captured by the Technovore and orders War Machine to fire the satellite's defense laser at Tony's arc reactor before the Technovore is able to use the other satellites to destroy the world. War Machine fires, and the Technovore is defeated with Iron Man seemingly sacrificing himself. Miraculously, Iron Man is saved by War Machine and lives. Ezekiel Stane is seen in the custody of S.H.I.E.L.D.

Cast

Additional English dub voices by Liam O'Brien, Travis Willingham, and Dave Wittenberg.

Crew
 Steve Kramer - Script Adaptation
 Mary Elizabeth McGlynn - Voice Director
 Jamie Simone - Casting Director

Production
The film is produced by SH DTV Partners, a partnership between Marvel Entertainment, Sony Pictures Entertainment Japan and Madhouse.

Screenwriter Brandon Auman stated in an interview with MTV Geek that he was in Japan when he got the call from Marvel to participate in the project, and that he was pleased to work with Madhouse. He said that the reason for choosing Ezekiel Stane as the main villain of the film was because he is the "new Tony Stark".

Release
The film was released in North America on Blu-ray and DVD on April 16, 2013, and on April 24, 2013 in Japan receiving the release of Marvel Studios' Iron Man 3 which was released on May 3, 2013.

Reception
The film has received mixed  reviews. John Gholson of Movies.com criticized the dialogue in the film, stating it "is either nebulous to a fault" or "awkwardly on the nose". He also criticized the animation of the film, describing it as stale or lacking thrill during action scenes. Tony Guerrero of Comic Vine gave a 3 of 5 rating, praising the animation and colors of the film. He noted that having different characters involved in the story [compared to the anime television series] gives the world a bigger feel, and this is what a fan would want and expect in a Marvel animated movie. Gary Collinson of Flickering Myth awarded it a score of one out of five, saying "If this is going to be the standard of Marvel’s animated movies going forward, then perhaps its time to hand animated duties over to Disney and stick to the Cinematic Universe." Julian White of Starburst magazine awarded it a score of 6 out of 10, saying, "It has its moments – probably enough to keep Marvel fans happy. Anime aficionados, on the other hand, might not be quite so galvanized."

References

External links
 Rise of Technovore at Sony Pictures Entertainment
 Rise of Technovore at Marvel
 
 
 

2013 animated films
2013 anime OVAs
2013 direct-to-video films
2013 films
2010s direct-to-video animated superhero films
Animated films based on Marvel Comics
Direct-to-video animated films
Films directed by Hiroshi Hamasaki
Iron Man films
Madhouse (company)
2010s Japanese superhero films
Japanese animated superhero films
Anime films based on comics
Sony Pictures Entertainment Japan films
Superheroes in anime and manga
Japanese adult animated films
2010s American films